Polyommatus is a genus of butterflies in the family Lycaenidae. 
Its species are found in the Palearctic realm.

Taxonomy
Recent molecular studies have demonstrated that Cyaniris, Lysandra, and Neolysandra are different genera from Polyommatus, where they had been included, sometimes as subgenera.

Some authors still recognize other subgenera, such as Agrodiaetus, Bryna, Meleageria, and Plebicula.

List of species

References

  (2012): Establishing criteria for higher-level classification using molecular data: the systematics of Polyommatus blue butterflies (Lepidoptera, Lycaenidae). Cladistics. 10.1111/j.1096-0031.2012.00421.x
  (2010): "How common are dot-like distributions? Taxonomical oversplitting in western European Agrodiaetus (Lepidoptera: Lycaenidae) revealed by chromosomal and molecular markers. Biological Journal of the Linnean Society 101:130-154 (2010)  abstract

Further reading
French Wikipedia has more information about this genus at :fr: Polyommatus

External links

Images representing  Polyommatus  at Consortium for the Barcode of Life

 
Lycaenidae genera
Taxa named by Pierre André Latreille